This page lists results of Canadian federal elections in Southwestern Ontario.

Regional profile
Beginning at the start of the 1960s, Southwestern Ontario has traditionally given more support to the Liberals, aside from 1984, although there has always been a pronounced urban-rural split: the New Democrats (NDP) and Liberals are both stronger in Windsor and London, while the rural areas and Sarnia have leaned more towards the Conservatives due to their social conservative bent. The Liberals swept all the ridings in the region in 1993, 1997 and 2000, save one NDP win in 2000.

However, in the 2004, 2006, 2008 and 2011 elections, the entire region, incrementally swung away from the Liberals to support the Conservatives, including in London, where three-way vote-splitting resulted in two ridings switching from Liberal to Conservative.  The loss of the second one, London North Centre, in the 2011 election, left the Liberals without any seats in Southwestern Ontario for the first time since Confederation.  The exception to Conservative swing was in one London riding, London-Fanshawe, and in Windsor's two ridings, which remained with the NDP from 2006 right through the 2015 election.

In 2015, Southwestern Ontario's election results did not at all mirror the overall federal election results.  The Liberals managed to take back two seats in the entire Region, both in London, but the NDP added a seat adjacent to Windsor, Essex, and the Conservatives retained four seats, three rural and also Sarnia-Lambton. The 2019 election saw the NDP lose two of the three Windsor area seats it held before the election, with one of each going to the Conservatives and the Liberals. This election also saw increased regional polarization, with all seats in urban London and Windsor being won by the Liberals or the NDP, and all other seats being won by the Conservatives.

2019 - 43rd General Election

|-
| style="background-color:whitesmoke" |Chatham-Kent—Leamington
|
|Katie Omstead16,89931.24%
||
|Dave Epp25,35946.88%
|
|Tony Walsh8,22915.21%
|
|Mark Vercouteren2,2334.13%
|
|John Balagtas1,0611.96%
|
|Paul Coulbeck (Mar.)3070.57%
||
|Dave Van Kesteren†
|-
| style="background-color:whitesmoke" |Elgin—Middlesex—London
|
|Pam Armstrong14,32423.20%
||
|Karen Vecchio31,02650.24%
|
|Bob Hargreaves11,01917.84%
|
|Ericha Hendel3,5625.77%
|
|Donald Helkaa9561.55%
|
|Peter Redecop (CHP)6181.00%Richard Styve (Libert.)2490.40%
||
|Karen Vecchio
|-
| style="background-color:whitesmoke" |Essex
|
|Audrey Festeryga12,98719.02%
||
|Chris Lewis28,27441.40%
|
|Tracey Ramsey23,60334.56%
|
|Jennifer Alderson2,1733.18%
|
|Bill Capes1,2511.83%
|
|
||
|Tracey Ramsey
|-
| style="background-color:whitesmoke" |Lambton—Kent—Middlesex
|
|Jesse McCormick14,81425.36%
||
|Lianne Rood28,65149.05%
|
|Dylan Mclay9,35516.02%
|
|Anthony Li3,4635.93%
|
|Bria Atkins1,8043.09%
|
|Rob Lalande (VCP)3250.56%
||
|Bev Shipley†
|-
| style="background-color:whitesmoke" |London—Fanshawe
|
|Mohamed Hammoud14,92426.85%
|
|Michael van Holst13,77024.78%
||
|Lindsay Mathyssen22,67140.79%
|
|Tom Cull2,7815.00%
|
|Bela Kosoian1,1322.04%
|
|Stephen Campbell (Ind.)2970.53%
||
|Irene Mathyssen†
|-
| style="background-color:whitesmoke" |London North Centre
||
|Peter Fragiskatos27,24742.75%
|
|Sarah Bokhari15,06623.64%
|
|Dirka Prout14,88723.36%
|
|Carol Dyck4,8727.64%
|
|Salim Mansur1,5322.40%
|
|Clara Sorrenti (Comm.)1370.21%
||
|Peter Fragiskatos
|-
| style="background-color:whitesmoke" |London West
||
|Kate Young30,62242.96%
|
|Liz Snelgrove19,91027.93%
|
|Shawna Lewkowitz15,22021.35%
|
|Mary Ann Hodge3,8275.37%
|
|Mike Mcmullen1,1711.64%
|
|Jacques Boudreau (Libert.)5230.73%
||
|Kate Young
|-
| style="background-color:whitesmoke" |Sarnia—Lambton
|
|Carmen Lemieux12,04120.79%
||
|Marilyn Gladu28,62349.42%
|
|Adam Kilner12,64421.83%
|
|Peter Robert Smith2,4904.30%
|
|Brian Everaert1,5872.74%
|
|Thomas Laird (CHP)5310.92%
||
|Marilyn Gladu
|-
| style="background-color:whitesmoke" |Windsor—Tecumseh
||
|Irek Kusmierczyk19,04633.44%
|
|Leo Demarce15,85127.83%
|
|Cheryl Hardcastle18,41732.33%
|
|Giovanni Abati2,1773.82%
|
|Dan Burr1,2792.25%
|
|Laura Chesnik (M-L)1870.33%
||
|Cheryl Hardcastle
|-
| style="background-color:whitesmoke" |Windsor West
|
|Sandra Pupatello18,87836.33%
|
|Henry Lau9,92519.10%
||
|Brian Masse20,80040.03%
|
|Quinn Hunt1,3252.55%
|
|Darryl Burrell9581.84%
|
|Margaret Villamizar (M-L)760.15%
||
|Brian Masse
|}<noinclude>

2015 - 42nd General Election

2011 - 41st General Election

2008 - 40th General Election

2006 - 39th General Election

2004 - 38th General Election

Chatham-Kent-Essex
Elgin-Middlesex-London
Essex
London-Fanshawe
London North Centre
London West
Lambton-Kent-Middlesex
Sarnia-Lambton
Windsor-Tecumseh
Windsor West

2000 - 37th General Election

Southwestern

6